Porgera Rural LLG is a local-level government (LLG) of Enga Province, Papua New Guinea.

Wards
01. Anawe
02. Mugulep
03. Apalaka
04. Yuyan
05. Politika
06. Paiyam
07. Palipaka
08. Kairik
09. Tipinini
11. Yomodaka
12. Yanjakali
13. Nekeyanga
14. Yaparep
15. Yarik
16. Pandami (Kairik)
18. Taipoko
83. Porgera Urban
- Yanjakali
- Suyan

84. Paiam Town
-Paiam
- Lukale
-kairik one

References

Local-level governments of Enga Province